Juke Joint is a 1947 race film directed by and starring Spencer Williams and produced and released by Sack Amusement Enterprises. The film was considered lost until being rediscovered.

Plot
Bad News Johnson, a con artist from Memphis, Tennessee, arrives in Dallas, Texas, accompanied by his dim sidekick July Jones with only twenty-five cents between them.  Johnson is constantly exasperated at Jones’ deficient perspicacity, and at one point he comments Jones is so dense that he probably thinks "Veronica Lake is some kind of summer resort." The duo arrange to become boarders at the home of Louella "Mama Lou" Holiday, who is fooled into believing Johnson is an acting teacher named Whitney Vanderbilt; Jones takes the alias of Cornbread Green. Mrs. Holiday agrees to give the men free room and board if they will provide poise lessons to her daughter, an aspiring beauty queen named Honey Dew. The lessons pay off and Honey Dew wins the beauty contest, but problems arise when Mrs. Holiday’s husband, Papa Sam, decides to hold a party for the new beauty queen at a disreputable juke joint.

Cast
 Spencer Williams as Whitney Vanderbilt
 July Jones as "Cornbred" Green
 Inez Newell as "Mama Lou" Holiday
 Leonard Duncan as "Papa Sam" Holiday
 Dauphine Moore as "Honey Dew" Holiday
 Melody Duncan as Melody Holuday
 Katherine Moore as Florida Holiday
 Alford Patterson as Jefferson Lee
 Albert Smith as "High Life" Harris
 Howard Galloway as Juke Joint Johnny
 Clifford Beamon as Bartender
 Frances McHugh as Waitress

Production
Juke Joint was the last in a series of films directed by Spencer Williams, an African American actor and writer, for production by Sack Amusement Enterprises, a white-owned Dallas-based company that distributed all-black race films to segregated theaters across the United States. Williams was among the few African Americans to direct films during the 1940s.

The juke joint scenes were filmed on location at the Rose Room in Dallas and Don’s Keyhole in San Antonio, Texas, and included musical numbers featuring band leader Red Calhoun.

Following the release of Juke Joint, Williams disappeared from the entertainment industry.  He returned to prominence in 1951 when he was cast as Andrew H. “Andy” Brown in the television version of the radio comedy Amos 'n Andy, which ran on CBS from 1951 to 1953. He made one final film appearance in a small role in the 1962 Italian horror production L'Orribile Segreto del Dottor Hitchcock.

Juke Joint was considered a lost film for many years, until a print was located in 1983 in a warehouse in Tyler, Texas.

See also
 List of films in the public domain in the United States

References

External links
 
 

1947 films
American black-and-white films
Films directed by Spencer Williams
Race films
American comedy-drama films
1947 comedy-drama films
1940s English-language films
1940s American films